Irkutsk-Passazhirsky is the primary passenger railway station for the city of Irkutsk in Russia, and an important stop along the Trans-Siberian Railway.  The main building takes an area of 7,590 square metres.

Trains and destinations

Major Domestic Routes 
 Moscow — Vladivostok
 Novosibirsk — Vladivostok
 Moscow — Khabarovsk
 Novosibirsk — Neryungri
 Moscow — Ulan Ude
 Adler — Irkutsk
 Adler — Chita

International

References

Railway stations in Irkutsk Oblast
Trans-Siberian Railway
Railway stations in the Russian Empire opened in 1899
Cultural heritage monuments in Irkutsk Oblast